Samantha Nicole Peszek (born December 14, 1991) is an American former artistic gymnast. She was a member of the U.S. women's gymnastics team at the 2008 Summer Olympics, which won silver.

Following her elite gymnastics career, Peszek competed for the UCLA Bruins. She is a 17-time All-American, the 2011 and 2015 NCAA balance beam champion, and the 2015 NCAA all-around co-champion with Kytra Hunter.

Elite career

In 2007, Peszek was part of the gold-medal-winning American teams at the World Artistic Gymnastics Championships and the Pan American Games. In March 2008, she competed at the American Cup and placed third in the all-around, behind U.S. teammates Nastia Liukin and Shawn Johnson.

After solid performances at the 2008 National Championships, Olympic Trials, and Olympic selection camp, Peszek was chosen as a member of the U.S. Olympic team, along with Johnson, Liukin, Chellsie Memmel, Alicia Sacramone, and Bridget Sloan.

At the 2008 Olympics in Beijing, Peszek injured her ankle during warm-ups just minutes before the women's qualification and was able to compete only on the uneven bars. She was the second gymnast on the U.S. team to be injured, the other being Memmel.

After the Olympics, Peszek took time off to let her ankle heal before returning to elite competition at the 2009 CoverGirl U.S. Classic, where she placed second on vault. She then competed at the National Championships, hoping to make the World Championships team as a three-event specialist; she planned to postpone surgery to fix a torn labrum in her shoulder. She placed second on beam and seventh on floor exercise at Nationals and made it to the second and final selection camp for Worlds, but pulled out and decided to get her torn labrum fixed.

NCAA career 
In her first season at UCLA, Peszek won the balance beam title at the 2011 NCAA Women's Gymnastics Championships, where she became the first college gymnast to do a standing backflip with a full twist on the beam. She was a first-team All-American on beam in 2011 and 2012.

Peszek redshirted the 2013 NCAA season after suffering a torn Achilles tendon. Later in 2013, she became an NACGC/W Scholastic All-American for the third consecutive year, and was inducted into the USA Gymnastics Hall of Fame as a member of the 2007 World Championships team.

In 2014, she returned to NCAA competition. In a tri-meet against Michigan and Utah, she competed in the all-around for the first time since 2012 and won with a total score of 39.65 (9.925 on vault, 9.875 on uneven bars, 9.925 on balance beam, and 9.925 on floor exercise). She then posted a career-high 39.70 all-around score during a tri-meet against Utah State and Bowling Green (9.950 on vault, 9.975 on uneven bars, 9.925 on balance beam, and 9.850 on floor exercise).

In March 2014, Peszek competed at the Pac-12 Conference Championship. She contributed scores of 9.825 on vault, 9.900 on uneven bars, 9.925 on balance beam, and 9.775 on floor exercise to the UCLA team's fourth-place finish. Individually, she was named the 2014 Pac-12 balance beam champion and finished second in the all-around competition.

In 2015, she opted to use her final year of NCAA eligibility as a fifth-year senior. She won the NCAA title on the balance beam with a score of 9.95, and the all-around title (tied with University of Florida gymnast Kytra Hunter) with a score of 39.60.

Career Perfect 10.0

Retirement  
Peszek retired from competitive gymnastics following the 2015 NCAA National Championships. She ended her career as an Olympic medalist, a World Champion and a 3-time NCAA champion.

Post-retirement 
Peszek was hired by the Pac-12 Network as a color commentator for the 2016 gymnastics season. In 2017, Peszek started Beam Queen Bootcamp, a camp where she helps young gymnasts gain confidence and understand judging on the balance beam.  In 2018 Peszek announced that she had started a podcast called I Have Cool Friends, on which she interviews prominent figures in the sport of gymnastics, including athletes and coaches.

Personal life
Both of Samantha's parents were athletes at the University of Illinois. Her father Ed was a wrestler and a hockey player; her mother Luan was a gymnast and, more recently, vice-president of the women's program at USA Gymnastics. Samantha's mom put her in gymnastics at the age 3. Samantha's younger sister Jessica is also a gymnast, at Western Michigan University.

Peszek is Catholic and graduated from Cathedral High School in 2010.

After the 2008 Olympics, Peter Zhao, Peszek's longtime coach at DeVeau's School of Gymnastics, retired from coaching and returned to China to help with his family's business. Peszek transferred to Sharp's Gymnastics Academy, where she trained alongside Olympic teammate Bridget Sloan.

Peszek graduated from UCLA and lives in Los Angeles.

In light of the USA Gymnastics sex abuse scandal, Peszek has revealed that people have been wishing death and rape onto her and her family throughout Larry Nassar's trial due to the fact that her mother is vice president of program development for USA Gymnastics.

Routines

Elite (2008) 
 Vault – Double-twisting laid-out Yurchenko
 Uneven bars – Straight mount to high bar; kip; swing 1.5; Jaeger; clear hip 1/2 to Gienger; clear hip; bail to handstand on low bar; stalder transition to high bar; giant full; full-twisting double layout dismount
 Balance Beam – Back tuck 1/1 to back pike; front aerial to back handspring to layout step-out; switch side leap; front tuck; aerial cartwheel; full turn with leg at horizontal; wolf hop to switch leap to gainer layout step-out; round-off double pike dismount
 Floor Exercise – 1.5 twist to double back tuck; double layout; ring leap to switch 1/2; Arabian double front; triple turn; switch 1/1; double pike

NCAA (2014) 
 Vault – Full-twisting laid-out Yurchenko
 Uneven bars – Glide kip; squat on low bar to hang on high bar; kip, cast to handstand; giant 1/1, Gienger; kip, cast to handstand; bail to handstand on low bar; toe-on to high bar; double layout dismount
 Floor Exercise – Double layout; front layout 1/1, front layout; split leap; split leap 1/2; double pike; double spin, wolf jump 1/1
 Balance Beam – Back tuck 1/1; front aerial, back tuck; switch leap, straddle jump; full turn; back handspring, layout step-out, layout 1/1 dismount

Floor music
 2009: "Reflejo de Luna" by Alacran and "It's You" by N.O.H.A.
 2008: "Whatever Lola Wants" by The Gotan Project
 2007: "My Number One" by Helena Paparizou
 2005: "Mr. Pinstripe Suit" by Big Bad Voodoo Daddy

Competitive history

References

External links

 
 
 
 
 
 

1991 births
American female artistic gymnasts
Gymnasts at the 2007 Pan American Games
Gymnasts at the 2008 Summer Olympics
Living people
Medalists at the 2008 Summer Olympics
Medalists at the World Artistic Gymnastics Championships
Olympic silver medalists for the United States in gymnastics
Pan American Games gold medalists for the United States
People from Hancock County, Indiana
Sportspeople from Indianapolis
UCLA Bruins women's gymnasts
University of California, Los Angeles alumni
Pan American Games medalists in gymnastics
Gymnasts from Indiana
Catholics from Indiana
U.S. women's national team gymnasts
Medalists at the 2007 Pan American Games
NCAA gymnasts who have scored a perfect 10